Adilson dos Santos Souza (born 18 February 1987 in Barra do Rocha), simply known as Adilson, is a Brazilian footballer who plays as a forward.

Statistics

References

External links

 

1987 births
Living people
Sportspeople from Bahia
Brazilian footballers
Association football forwards
Campeonato Brasileiro Série A players
Campeonato Brasileiro Série B players
Sport Club do Recife players
Grêmio Barueri Futebol players
Ipatinga Futebol Clube players
Esporte Clube XV de Novembro (Piracicaba) players
Mogi Mirim Esporte Clube players
Esporte Clube Noroeste players
Sport Club Corinthians Paulista players
Santa Cruz Futebol Clube players
Associação Portuguesa de Desportos players
Yangon United F.C. players
Marília Atlético Clube players
Clube Atlético Juventus players
Ituano FC players
Sport Club Atibaia players
Rio Claro Futebol Clube players
Brazilian expatriate footballers
Brazilian expatriate sportspeople in Myanmar
Expatriate footballers in Myanmar